The Richard Henry Deming House is a historic home in Providence, Rhode Island.  It is a -story wood-frame structure, and is one of the most elaborate Second Empire mansions in the city's Elmwood neighborhood.  Built c. 1870 for a wealthy cotton broker, it has a mansard roof, bracketed window hoods, and an elaborately decorated front porch.  It has retained much of its interior woodwork, despite its conversion to apartments.

The house was listed on the National Register of Historic Places in 1980.

See also
National Register of Historic Places listings in Providence, Rhode Island

References

Houses on the National Register of Historic Places in Rhode Island
Houses in Providence, Rhode Island
National Register of Historic Places in Providence, Rhode Island